Paola Palencia (born 16 March 1979) is a Mexican former professional tennis player.

Born in Córdoba, Palencia featured in a total of nine Fed Cup ties for Mexico, between 1996 and 1998. She played mostly as a doubles player and was unbeaten in the six rubbers where she partnered with Melody Falcó. Her only singles rubber was a win over Costa Rica's Melissa Golfin.

Palencia won two silver medals for Mexico at the 1998 Central American and Caribbean Games in Maracaibo.

Between 1999 and 2002 she played collegiate tennis for Pepperdine University, where she twice earned All-American honors for doubles (partnering İpek Şenoğlu).

ITF finals

Doubles: 1 (0–1)

References

External links
 
 
 

1979 births
Living people
Mexican female tennis players
Sportspeople from Córdoba, Veracruz
Pepperdine Waves women's tennis players
Competitors at the 1998 Central American and Caribbean Games
Central American and Caribbean Games silver medalists for Mexico
Central American and Caribbean Games medalists in tennis
20th-century Mexican women